Jingle County is a county of central Shanxi province, China. It is under the administration of Xinzhou city.

Climate

References

External links
www.xzqh.org 

County-level divisions of Shanxi
Xinzhou